Justin Cross (born August 19, 1959) is a former American football offensive tackle who played professionally in the National Football League (NFL) with the Buffalo Bills from 1982 to 1986. He played college football for Western State. He originally went to Western State for skiing, not football. During his five-year career as a Buffalo Bill, Cross played in 44 games and started 16 of them. In 1983, he played in 15 games and started 13 of them at right tackle.

References

External links
 

Living people
1959 births
American football offensive tackles
Canadian players of American football
Buffalo Bills players
Western Colorado Mountaineers football players
People from Portsmouth, New Hampshire
Players of American football from New Hampshire